Gaiu may refer to:

Gaiu Mic, a village in Moravița Commune, Timiș County, Romania
Gaiu Mare, the Romanian name for Veliki Gaj village, Plandište municipality, Serbia
Valeriu Gaiu, a Moldovan footballer